Henry Richard Davies (born 2 September 1970) is an English former first-class cricketer.

Davies was born at Camberwell in September 1970. He was educated at St Dunstan's College, before going up to Christ Church, Oxford. While studying at Oxford, he played first-class cricket for Oxford University, making his debut against Hampshire in 1990. He played first-class cricket for Oxford until 1992, making a total of seventeen appearances. He scored a total of 178 runs in his seventeen matches, averaging 12.71 and with a high score of 39. With his right-arm off-break bowling, he took 13 wickets at a bowling average of 105.92, with best figures of 3 for 93.

References

External links

1970 births
Living people
People from Camberwell
People educated at St Dunstan's College
Alumni of Christ Church, Oxford
English cricketers
Oxford University cricketers